José Manuel Silva Oliveira (born 23 October 1990), commonly known as Zé Manuel, is a Portuguese professional footballer who plays for C.D. Nacional on loan from Rio Ave F.C. as a winger.

Club career
Born in Braga, Zé Manuel finished his youth career with local club S.C. Braga. He spent the better part of his first three seasons as a senior in the third division with Merelinense FC, but also managed to appear once in the Primeira Liga with Braga, coming on as an 88th-minute substitute in a 1−1 away draw against FC Porto on 24 May 2009.

Having returned to his hometown in the summer of 2011, Zé Manuel represented exclusively F.C. Vizela (farm team, third tier) and the reserves (Segunda Liga). For the second part of the 2012–13 campaign, he was also loaned to division-three side C.D. Cinfães.

In the 2013 off-season, Zé Manuel signed with Boavista F.C. who competed in the third division, being immediately promoted to the top flight as a result of the consequences of the Apito Dourado affair. He made his debut with the club in the latter competition on 17 August 2014, featuring 60 minutes in a 3–0 loss at former team Braga. He produced exactly the same numbers in his second and third seasons, scoring six goals in 31 matches.

On 25 June 2016, free agent Zé Manuel joined Porto on a five-year contract. He never appeared for them in competitive games, being successively loaned to Vitória de Setúbal, Wisła Kraków and C.D. Feirense.

Zé Manuel agreed to a two-year deal at newly-promoted C.D. Santa Clara in July 2018. At one point during his spell in the Azores, he was their all-time scorer in the Portuguese top tier.

In October 2020, Zé Manuel signed for CS Gaz Metan Mediaș of the Romanian Liga I. The following 2 July, he returned to his country on a two-year contract with second-division Rio Ave FC.

References

External links

1990 births
Living people
Sportspeople from Braga
Portuguese footballers
Association football wingers
Primeira Liga players
Liga Portugal 2 players
Segunda Divisão players
Merelinense F.C. players
S.C. Braga players
F.C. Vizela players
S.C. Braga B players
C.D. Cinfães players
Boavista F.C. players
FC Porto players
Vitória F.C. players
C.D. Feirense players
C.D. Santa Clara players
Rio Ave F.C. players
C.D. Nacional players
Ekstraklasa players
Wisła Kraków players
Liga I players
CS Gaz Metan Mediaș players
Portugal youth international footballers
Portuguese expatriate footballers
Expatriate footballers in Poland
Expatriate footballers in Romania
Portuguese expatriate sportspeople in Poland
Portuguese expatriate sportspeople in Romania